The Great Waters Music Festival (GWMF) is an annual summer music festival held in Wolfeboro, New Hampshire, United States, two hours north of Boston. The festival was founded in 1995 to promote live musical performances of outstanding amateur and professional musicians. It consists of a wide range of musical performances  including choral, symphonic, folk, pops, jazz, Broadway, and dance. Since the first festival, which attracted 325 attendees, it has grown to an audience of over 7,000 over its eight-week concert schedule. While originally concerts were held in a large white tent, the venue moved in 2011 to the newly built Kingswood Arts Center, an air-conditioned facility which seats nearly 1,000.

Celebrity performers
The GWMF attracts artists from around the world. The following is a partial list of artists who have performed at the festival.

 Lucie Arnaz
 Big Bad Voodoo Daddy
 Dave Brubeck
 Betty Buckley
 Canadian Brass
 Judy Collins
 Sandy Duncan
 Nanci Griffith
 Arlo Guthrie
 Richie Havens
 Natalie MacMaster
 Chuck Mangione
 Wynton Marsalis
 Glenn Miller Orchestra
 Peter Nero
 Gretchen Peters
 Rockapella
 Veronica Swift
 Ronan Tynan

References

External links
 

Music festivals in New Hampshire
Summer festivals
Tourist attractions in Carroll County, New Hampshire
Wolfeboro, New Hampshire